Vidzeme District is one of six administrative districts of Riga, the capital of Latvia.

Administrative divisions of Riga